Fuenterroble de Salvatierra is a village and municipality in the province of Salamanca,  western Spain, part of the autonomous community of Castile-Leon.

Geography

See also
Los Santos mine

References

Municipalities in the Province of Salamanca